Ganh Da Dia  (Gành Đá Dĩa or Ghềnh Đá Dĩa in Vietnamese, literally means The Sea Cliff of Stone Plates) is a seashore area of uniformly interlocking basalt rock columns located along the coast in An Ninh Dong Commune, Tuy An District, Phu Yen Province, Vietnam.

The area is about 100 meters wide and 250 meters long, composed of an estimated 35,000 columns of basalt rocks.  The rocks are dark lava columns with roughly flat surfaces of different shapes - round, pentagon, hexagon, polygon etc. Ghenh Da Dia looks like a gigantic beehive or a pile of dinner plates, hence the name – Ghenh Da Dia (The Sea Cliff of Stone Plates).
  
These rock columns were created from volcanic eruptions millions of years ago; when the molten basalt flows met cold water, they solidified and shaped these rare polygonal formations due to thermal contraction effects.

Ganh Da Dia was enlisted as a National Heritage site in January 1998 by Vietnam's Ministry of Culture, Sports and Tourism.

See also
 Giant's Causeway, a similar site in Northern Ireland

References

http://english.vov.vn/Travel/Places/Rock-masterpiece-at-Ghenh-Da-Dia-in-Phu-Yen-province/281519.vov 
https://web.archive.org/web/20150705013114/http://vnexpress.net/tin-tuc/thoi-su/du-lich/ky-quan-ghenh-da-dia-2162897.html
http://news.zing.vn/Ghenh-Da-Dia-Phu-Yen-Dau-chan-thien-duong-post458851.html
https://www.anbuiphotography.com/2022/08/da-dia-reef-great-place-for-photography.html

Tourist attractions in Vietnam
Geology of Vietnam
Volcanism of Southeast Asia